Modern Sounds is the debut album by trumpeter and bandleader Shorty Rogers featuring performances recorded in late 1951 and originally released as a 10-inch LP on the Capitol label. The tracks were also released in 1956 on a 12-inch LP split album under the same title with additional recordings by Gerry Mulligan.

Reception

The AllMusic review by Stephen Cook observed: "Rogers' outfit includes then future West Coast stars like alto saxophonist Art Pepper, tenor saxophonist Jimmy Giuffre, pianist Hampton Hawes, and drummer Shelley Manne, among others. Each soloist gets plenty of room to stretch out on a set including four Rogers originals".

Track listing
All compositions by Shorty Rogers except where noted.
 "Popo" - 2:59
 "Over the Rainbow" (Harold Arlen, Yip Harburg) - 2:59 	
 "Four Mothers" (Jimmy Giuffre) - 2:46  	
 "Didi" - 2:24	
 "Sam and the Lady" - 3:05 	
 "Apropos" - 2:36

Personnel
Shorty Rogers - trumpet, arranger 
John Graas - French horn
Gene Englund - tuba
Art Pepper - alto saxophone
Jimmy Giuffre - tenor saxophone, arranger
Hampton Hawes - piano
Don Bagley - bass
Shelly Manne - drums

References

Shorty Rogers albums
1952 debut albums
Capitol Records albums